Thomas Henry Bestwick (1864 – 1946) was an English footballer who played for Derby County.

Harry Bestwick joined Derby County sometime in 1886 and he was signed from local club Long Eaton Rangers. He played in some of Derby County' FA Cup ties before League started in September 1888.

Harry Bestwick made his League debut, in goal, on 20 October 1888 at County Ground, the then home of Derby County. The visitors were Everton who won 4–2. That was Bestwick' only appearance in the first–team in season 1888–1889.

Harry Bestwick was not retained for the 1889–1890 season and returned to Long Eaton Rangers.

References

1864 births
1946 deaths
English footballers
Association football forwards
Derby County F.C. players
English Football League players
People from Long Eaton
Footballers from Derbyshire